The 1990 Hardy Cup was the 1990 edition of the Canadian intermediate senior ice hockey championship. It was the last playing of the Hardy Cup.

Final
Best of 7
Paul Bland 7 Dartmouth 1
Dartmouth 4 Paul Bland 2
Paul Bland 6 Dartmouth 4
Paul Bland 4 Dartmouth 2
Dartmouth 5 Paul Bland 2
Dartmouth 2 Paul Bland 1
Dartmouth 6 Paul Bland 1
Dartmouth Moosehead Mounties beat Paul Bland Hawks 4–3 on series.

External links
Hockey Canada

Hardy Cup
Calg